Cavazza or Cavassa may refer to:

Casa Cavassa, a Renaissance-style palazzo in Saluzzo, Piedmont, Italy, and the site of the city's museum, the Museo Civico Casa Cavassa

Persons
Claudio Cavazza (1934–2011), Italian entrepreneur
Elisabeth Cavazza (1849–1926), American author, journalist, music critic
Giovanni Battista Cavazza, Italian painter and engraver
Maria de Francesca-Cavazza, German operatic soprano
Pier Francesco Cavazza (1675–1755), Italian painter and art collector
Sandro Cavazza (born 1992), Swedish singer and songwriter
Sebastian Cavazza (born 1973), Slovenian actor

See also
Giorgio Cavazzano (born 1947), Italian cartoonist
Cassava, a woody shrub native to South America of the spurge family, Euphorbiaceae